Pyramid Mountain is a  summit located in British Columbia, Canada.

Description
Pyramid Mountain is set on the east side of Mamquam Lake in the southwest section of Garibaldi Provincial Park. It is part of the Garibaldi Ranges of the Coast Mountains. Topographic relief is significant as the summit rises 1,020 meters (3,346 feet) above Eanastick Meadows in 1.5 kilometer (0.9 mile). Precipitation runoff from the peak drains to Skookum Creek, thence Mamquam River. The toponym was officially adopted September 7, 1978, by the Geographical Names Board of Canada.

Climate

Based on the Köppen climate classification, Pyramid Mountain is located in the marine west coast climate zone of western North America. Most weather fronts originate in the Pacific Ocean, and travel east toward the Coast Mountains where they are forced upward by the range (Orographic lift), causing them to drop their moisture in the form of rain or snowfall. As a result, the Coast Mountains experience high precipitation, especially during the winter months in the form of snowfall. Winter temperatures can drop below −20 °C with wind chill factors below −30 °C.

See also
 
 Geography of British Columbia

Gallery

References

External links
 Pyramid Mountain (photo, left): Flickr

Garibaldi Ranges
Two-thousanders of British Columbia
Sea-to-Sky Corridor
New Westminster Land District
Coast Mountains